Alina Pätz (born 8 March 1990 in Urdorf, Switzerland)  is a Swiss curler. She currently throws fourth stones on Team Silvana Tirinzoni. She is a five-time world champion and was the alternate player for the Mirjam Ott rink, which represented Switzerland at the 2014 Winter Olympics.

Career
Playing as the alternate for the Ott rink, Pätz won a gold medal at the 2012 World Women's Curling Championship and a bronze medal at the 2013 European Curling Championships. Pätz also won a silver medal at the 2010 European Mixed Curling Championship (playing lead for Claudio Pätz) and a gold medal at the 2011 World Mixed Doubles Curling Championship (with Sven Michel).

Pätz started skipping her own rink in 2013. The 2014–15 season was a breakthrough year for Pätz and teammates Nadine Lehmann, Marisa Winkelhausen and Nicole Schwägli. They won the 2014 Red Deer Curling Classic on the World Curling Tour, which was Pätz's first tour win. Pätz also qualified for the playoffs at the 2014 Masters Grand Slam of Curling event. In the second half of the season, they won the International Bernese Ladies Cup and the Swiss Women's Curling Championship, qualifying them for the 2015 World Women's Curling Championship. Switzerland finished the round robin in first place with a 10–1 record. A victory over Canada's Jennifer Jones sent them to the final, where they once again faced Jones. Up 4–3 in the tenth end, Pätz drew to the button for the win, winning the World Championship gold medal and title.

The following season, Team Pätz won the right to represent Switzerland at the 2015 European Curling Championships, but they did not qualify for the playoffs, finishing 4–5. They also did not win any tour events during the season. They could not defend their title as world champions, as they lost in the Swiss championship to 2014 world champions Binia Feltscher. The 2016–17 season was more successful for the Swiss rink. They won the 2017 International Bernese Ladies Cup and made the final of the Glynhill Ladies International. They also won the Swiss championship and represented Switzerland at the 2017 World Women's Curling Championship. Despite starting 4–0, the team lost six of their last seven games, ultimately not qualifying for the playoffs. They ended their season by finishing second at the 2017 Euronics European Masters and making the semifinals of the 2017 Humpty's Champions Cup.

Team Pätz had several quarterfinal finishes during the 2017–18 curling season. They won the 2017 Stockholm Ladies Cup in October, defeating Kim Eun-jung in the final. The team competed against the other top Swiss teams, Silvana Tirinzoni and Binia Feltscher, at the 2017 Swiss Olympic Curling Trials to choose the Swiss representative at the 2018 Winter Olympics. The event was ultimately won by the Tirinzoni rink, which finished 6–0. After failing to win the Swiss championship in February, the Pätz team disbanded.

Heading into the 2018–19 curling season, Pätz joined forces with Silvana Tirinzoni, who would skip the team, but Pätz would throw fourth rocks, with Esther Neuenschwander at second and Melanie Barbezat throwing lead rocks. The team reached the final in the first Grand Slam of the season, the Elite 10. They represented Switzerland at the 2018 European Curling Championships, claiming the silver medal. They were unbeaten in the round robin, winning nine games, defeated Germany 6–4 in the semi-final, and lost 5–4 to Sweden's Anna Hasselborg in the final. Having won the 2019 Swiss National Championships, the team represented Switzerland at the 2019 World Women's Curling Championship in Silkeborg, Denmark. The team went 2–3 in their first five games, then won six games in a row to secure their playoff spot. They went on to finish the round robin with an 8–4 record and in fourth place in the standings. They defeated China in the qualification game and South Korea in the semi-final to set up a repeat of the European Championship final against Hasselborg and Sweden. The result was reversed, with Pätz making a draw to the four-foot in the extra end for an 8–7 win to become the 2019 world champions. The team capped off their year by winning their first Grand Slam title together at the Champions Cup and reaching the final of the inaugural Curling World Cup.

At the start of the 2019–20 season, Team Tirinzoni were runners-up at the 2019 Cameron's Brewing Oakville Fall Classic. They also qualified for the playoffs at their next three events, the 2019 Stu Sells Oakville Tankard, the 2019 AMJ Campbell Shorty Jenkins Classic and the 2019 WCT Uiseong International Curling Cup. The next week, they won the Women's Masters Basel. They represented Switzerland at the 2019 European Curling Championships, where they finished the round robin in first place with an 8–1 record. However, they would not make the final, as they lost to Scotland's Eve Muirhead in the semifinal. They rebounded in the bronze medal game, defeating Alina Kovaleva of Russia. The team would not get to defend their title as world champions, losing the final of the 2020 Swiss Women's Curling Championship to the young Elena Stern rink. The Swiss championship would be the team's last event of the season, as both the Players' Championship and the Champions Cup Grand Slam events were cancelled due to the COVID-19 pandemic.

Team Tirinzoni began the 2020–21 season by making the final of the 2020 Schweizer Cup, where they once again lost to the Stern rink. Three weeks later, the team was invited to play in the Adelboden International men's World Curling Tour event, as a last-minute addition. After dropping their first game to Yannick Schwaller, they went on a four-game winning streak against the men's field before losing to Olympic bronze medallist Peter de Cruz in the semifinal. In January 2021, Pätz compted at the 2021 Swiss Mixed Doubles Curling Championship with her boyfriend Sven Michel. The pair finished the round robin with a 5–2 record, in second place. They then defeated teammate Silvana Tirinzoni and Benoît Schwarz in the semifinal before losing the best-of-three final to Briar Hürlimann and Yannick Schwaller. Two weeks later, Pätz won her fourth national championship at the 2021 Swiss Women's Curling Championship. This put her team in a playoff against 2020 Champions Team Stern for the right to represent Switzerland at the 2021 World Women's Curling Championship, as the 2020 Worlds were cancelled due to the COVID-19 pandemic. Team Tirinzoni beat Stern in the playoff, and represented Switzerland at the World Championship, which was played in a bio-secure bubble in Calgary, Canada due to the pandemic. There, they finished with a 12–1 round robin record, including scoring a rare eight-ender against Denmark, the first time an eight-ender has ever been scored at a World Championship. In the playoffs, the team defeated the United States in the semifinal, and then Alina Kovaleva representing RCF (Russia) in the final to win the gold medal, successfully defending their 2019 championship. While also in the Calgary bubble, Team Tirinzoni played in two Grand Slam events, making the final at the 2021 Champions Cup and the semifinals at the 2021 Players' Championship.

Team Tirinzoni had a slow start to the 2021–22 season, not reaching any finals in their first five tour events. At the first two Slams, the 2021 Masters and the 2021 National, they went undefeated until losses in the quarterfinals and semifinals, respectively. At the 2021 European Curling Championships, the team failed to reach the playoffs for the first time, finishing in fifth with a 6–3 record. The next event the team played in was the 2022 Winter Olympics, where they found their footing for the first time during the season. They finished in first place after the preliminary round with an 8–1 round robin record. This earned them the top seed in the playoff round. They then, however, lost the semifinal to Japan's Satsuki Fujisawa and the bronze medal game to Sweden's Anna Hasselborg, placing fourth. Immediately after the Olympics, the team entered the Swiss Women's Curling Championship where they were once again able to defend their title, earning the right to represent Switzerland at the 2022 World Women's Curling Championship. At the championship, Team Tirinzoni dominated the competition, finishing the round robin with an unblemished 12–0 record. They then beat Sweden's Hasselborg in the semifinal to qualify once again for the world championship final where they would face South Korea's Kim Eun-jung. Switzerland took a three-point lead early, but Korea was able to tie the match later on. In the end, Pätz executed an open hit to win the match 7–6 and repeat for a third time as world women's curling champions. On April 25, the team announced that they would be splitting up at the end of the season, with front end Esther Neuenschwander and Melanie Barbezat stepping away from competitive curling. Team Tirinzoni ended their four-year run together with the final two Slam events of the season, the 2022 Players' Championship and the 2022 Champions Cup, where they had quarterfinal and semifinal finishes respectively. On May 12, Pätz and Tirinzoni announced that they would be staying together and adding Carole Howald and Briar Schwaller-Hürlimann to their team for the 2022–23 season. Also during the 2021–22 season, Pätz competed in the 2022 World Mixed Doubles Curling Championship with boyfriend Sven Michel. The pair went 7–2 through the round robin and won a tight semifinal over Norway to reach the gold medal match. There, they fell 9–7 to Eve Muirhead and Bobby Lammie of Scotland, earning the silver medal.

Personal life
Pätz is in a relationship with fellow curler Sven Michel. She lives in Matten bei Interlaken. Pätz has a bachelor's degree in economics and a Masters in Sport Science. She is employed as an athlete manager.

Grand Slam record

Former events

Teams

References

External links

1990 births
Swiss female curlers
Living people
Curlers at the 2014 Winter Olympics
Olympic curlers of Switzerland
People from Dietikon District
World curling champions
World mixed doubles curling champions
Continental Cup of Curling participants
Sportspeople from Zürich
People from Interlaken-Oberhasli District
Curlers at the 2022 Winter Olympics
21st-century Swiss women